This is a list of carousels on the U.S. National Register of Historic Places.

List

See also
Herschell Carrousel Factory

References

External links

 
Carousels